Polyethylene terephthalate (or poly(ethylene terephthalate), PET, PETE, or the obsolete PETP or PET-P), is the most common thermoplastic polymer resin of the polyester family and is used in fibres for clothing, containers for liquids and foods, and thermoforming for manufacturing, and in combination with glass fibre for engineering resins.

In 2016, annual production of PET was 56 million tons. The biggest application is in fibres (in excess of 60%), with bottle production accounting for about 30% of global demand. In the context of textile applications, PET is referred to by its common name, polyester, whereas the acronym PET is generally used in relation to packaging. Polyester makes up about 18% of world polymer production and is the fourth-most-produced polymer after polyethylene (PE), polypropylene (PP) and polyvinyl chloride (PVC).

PET consists of repeating (C10H8O4) units. PET is commonly recycled, and has the digit 1 (♳) as its resin identification code (RIC). The National Association for PET Container Resources (NAPCOR) defines PET as: "Polyethylene terephthalate items referenced are derived from terephthalic acid (or dimethyl terephthalate) and mono ethylene glycol, wherein the sum of terephthalic acid (or dimethyl terephthalate) and mono ethylene glycol reacted constitutes at least 90 percent of the mass of monomer reacted to form the polymer, and must exhibit a melting peak temperature between 225°C and 255°C, as identified during the second thermal scan in procedure 10.1 in ASTM D3418, when heating the sample at a rate of 10°C/minute."

Depending on its processing and thermal history, polyethylene terephthalate may exist both as an amorphous (transparent) and as a semi-crystalline polymer. The semicrystalline material might appear transparent (particle size less than 500 nm) or opaque and white (particle size up to a few micrometers) depending on its crystal structure and particle size.

One process for making PET uses bis(2-hydroxyethyl) terephthalate, which can be synthesized by the esterification reaction between terephthalic acid and ethylene glycol with water as a byproduct (this is also known as a condensation reaction), or by transesterification reaction between ethylene glycol and dimethyl terephthalate (DMT) with methanol as a byproduct.  Polymerization is through a polycondensation reaction of the monomers (done immediately after esterification/transesterification) with water as the byproduct.

{| class="wikitable" style="float:right; clear:right; width:300px;"
|-
| Young's modulus, E
| 2800–3100 MPa
|-
| Tensile strength, σt
| 55–75 MPa
|-
| Elastic limit
| 50–150%
|-
| Notch test
| 3.6 kJ/m2
|-
| Glass transition temperature, Tg
| 67–81 °C
|-
| Vicat B
| 82 °C
|-
| Linear expansion coefficient, α
| 
|-
| Water absorption (ASTM)
| 0.16
|-
! colspan="2" style="text-align:left;" | Source
|}

Uses

Textiles

Polyester fibres are widely used in the textile industry. The invention of the polyester fibre is attributed to J. R. Whinfield. It was first commercialized in the 1940s by ICI, under the brand 'Terylene'.  Subsequently E. I. DuPont launched the brand 'Dacron'. As of 2022, there are many brands around the world, mostly Asian.

Polyester fibres are used in fashion apparel often blended with cotton, as heat insulation layers in thermal wear, sportswear and workwear and automotive upholstery.

Rigid packaging
Plastic bottles made from PET are widely used for soft drinks, both still and sparkling. For beverages that are degraded by oxygen, such as beer, a multilayer structure is used. PET sandwiches an additional polyvinyl alcohol (PVOH) or polyamide (PA) layer to further reduce its oxygen permeability.

Non-oriented PET sheet can be thermoformed to make packaging trays and blister packs. Crystallizable PET withstands freezing and oven baking temperatures. Both amorphous PET and BoPET are transparent to the naked eye.  Color-conferring dyes can easily be formulated into PET sheet. 

PET is permeable to oxygen and carbon dioxide and this imposes shelf life limitations of contents packaged in PET.

Flexible packaging
Biaxially oriented PET (BOPET) film (often known by one of its trade names, "Mylar") can be aluminized by evaporating a thin film of metal onto it to reduce its permeability, and to make it reflective and opaque (MPET). These properties are useful in many applications, including flexible food packaging and thermal insulation (such as space blankets).

Photovoltaic modules
BOPET is used in the backsheet of photovoltaic modules.  Most backsheets consist of a layer of BOPET laminated to a fluoropolymer or a layer of UV stabilized BOPET.

PET is also used as a substrate in thin film solar cells.

Thermoplastic resins
PET can be compounded with glass fibre and crystallization accelerators, to make thermoplastic resins.  These can be injection moulded into parts such as housings, covers, electrical appliance components and elements of the ignition system.

Other applications

 A waterproofing barrier in undersea cables.

 As a film base.

 As a fibre, spliced into bell rope tops to help prevent wear on the ropes as they pass through the ceiling.

 Since late 2014 as liner material in type IV composite high pressure gas cylinders. PET works as a much better barrier to oxygen than earlier used (LD)PE.

 As a 3D printing filament, as well as in the 3D printing plastic PETG.

 Film for tape applications, such as the carrier for magnetic tape or backing for pressure-sensitive adhesive tapes.  Digitalization has caused the virtual disappeance of the magnetic audio and videotape application.

 Water-resistant paper.

History
PET was patented in 1941 by John Rex Whinfield, James Tennant Dickson and their employer the Calico Printers' Association of Manchester, England. E. I. DuPont de Nemours in Delaware, United States, first used the trademark Mylar in June 1951 and received registration of it in 1952. It is still the best-known name used for polyester film. The current owner of the trademark is DuPont Teijin Films.

In the Soviet Union, PET was first manufactured in the laboratories of the Institute of High-Molecular Compounds of the USSR Academy of Sciences in 1949, and its name "Lavsan" is an acronym thereof (лаборатории Института высокомолекулярных соединений Академии наук СССР).

The PET bottle was invented in 1973 by Nathaniel Wyeth and patented by DuPont.

Physical properties

PET in its most stable state is a colorless, semi-crystalline resin. However it is intrinsically slow to crystallize compared to other semicrystalline polymers. Depending on processing conditions it can be formed into either amorphous or crystalline articles.  Its amenability to drawing makes PET useful in fibre and film applications. Like most aromatic polymers, it has better barrier properties than aliphatic polymers. It is strong and impact-resistant. PET is hygroscopic. 

About 60% crystallization is the upper limit for commercial products, with the exception of polyester fibers. Transparent products can be produced by rapidly cooling molten polymer below Tg glass transition temperature to form an amorphous solid. Like glass, amorphous PET forms when its molecules are not given enough time to arrange themselves in an orderly, crystalline fashion as the melt is cooled. At room temperature the molecules are frozen in place, but, if enough heat energy is put back into them by heating above Tg, they begin to move again, allowing crystals to nucleate and grow. This procedure is known as solid-state crystallization.

When allowed to cool slowly, the molten polymer forms a more crystalline material. This material has spherulites containing many small crystallites when crystallized from an amorphous solid, rather than forming one large single crystal. Light tends to scatter as it crosses the boundaries between crystallites and the amorphous regions between them, causing the resulting solid to be translucent. 

Orientation also renders polymers more transparent.  This is why BOPET film and bottles are both crystalline to a degree and transparent.

Amorphous PET crystallizes and becomes opaque when exposed to solvents such as chloroform or toluene.

This could be a possible way of producing nanodiamonds commercially.

Absorption/scalping 
PET has an affinity for hydrophobic flavors and drinks sometimes need to be formulated with higher dosage compared to glass to offset the flavor taken up by the container.Heavy gauge PET bottles are sometimes returnable for re-use and is practiced in some EU countries, however the propensity of PET to absorb flavors makes it necessary to conduct a "sniffer" test on returned bottles to avoid cross-contamination.

Intrinsic viscosity

Different applications of PET require different degrees of polymerization, which can be obtained by modifying the process conditions.  The molecular weight of PET is measured by solution viscosity.  The preferred method is intrinsic viscosity (IV).

IV is a dimensionless measurement. It is found by extrapolating the relative viscosity (measured in (dℓ/g)) to zero concentration.

Shown below are the IV ranges for the main applications:

 Fibers
 0.40–0.70: textile
 0.72–0.98: technical eg tire cord
 Films
 0.60–0.70: biaxially oriented PET film
 0.70–1.00: sheet grade for thermoforming
 Bottles
 0.70–0.78: general purpose bottles 
 0.78–0.85: bottles for carbonated drinks
 Monofilaments, engineering plastics
 1.00–2.00

Copolymers
PET is copolymerized with other diols or diacids to optimize the properties for particular applications.

For example, cyclohexanedimethanol (CHDM) can be added to the polymer backbone in place of ethylene glycol. Since this building block is much larger (six additional carbon atoms) than the ethylene glycol unit it replaces, it does not fit in with the neighboring chains the way an ethylene glycol unit would. This interferes with crystallization and lowers the polymer's melting temperature. In general, such PET is known as PETG or PET-G (polyethylene terephthalate glycol-modified). It is a clear amorphous thermoplastic that can be injection-molded, sheet-extruded or extruded as filament for 3D printing. PETG can be colored during processing.

Another common modifier is isophthalic acid, replacing some of the 1,4-(para-) linked terephthalate units. The 1,2-(ortho-) or 1,3-(meta-) linkage produces an angle in the chain, which also disturbs crystallinity.

Such copolymers are advantageous for certain molding applications, such as thermoforming, which is used for example to make tray or blister packaging from co-PET film, or amorphous PET sheet (A-PET/PETA) or PETG sheet. On the other hand, crystallization is important in other applications where mechanical and dimensional stability are important, such as seat belts. For PET bottles, the use of small amounts of isophthalic acid, CHDM, diethylene glycol (DEG) or other comonomers can be useful: if only small amounts of comonomers are used, crystallization is slowed but not prevented entirely. As a result, bottles are obtainable via stretch blow molding ("SBM"), which are both clear and crystalline enough to be an adequate barrier to aromas and even gases, such as carbon dioxide in carbonated beverages.

Production
Polyethylene terephthalate is produced from ethylene glycol (usually referred to in the trade as "MEG", for monoethylene glycol) and dimethyl terephthalate (DMT) (C6H4(CO2CH3)2) but mostly terephthalic acid (known in the trade as "PTA", for purified terephthalic acid).  As of 2022, ethylene glycol is made from ethene found in natural gas, while terephthalic acid comes from p-xylene made from crude oil.  Typically an antimony or titanium compound is used as a catalyst, a phosphite is added as a stabilizer and a bluing agent such as cobalt salt is added to mask any yellowing.

Dimethyl terephthalate (DMT) process 

In the dimethyl terephthalate (DMT) process, DMT and excess MEG are transesterified in the melt at 150–200 °C with a basic catalyst. Methanol (CH3OH) is removed by distillation to drive the reaction forward. Excess MEG is distilled off at higher temperature with the aid of vacuum. The second transesterification step proceeds at 270–280 °C, with continuous distillation of MEG as well.

The reactions can be summarized as follows:
First step
 C6H4(CO2CH3)2 + 2 HOCH2CH2OH → C6H4(CO2CH2CH2OH)2 + 2 CH3OH

Second step
 n C6H4(CO2CH2CH2OH)2 → [(CO)C6H4(CO2CH2CH2O)]n + n HOCH2CH2OH

Terephthalic acid (PTA) process

In the terephthalic acid process, MEG and PTA are esterified directly at moderate pressure (2.7–5.5 bar) and high temperature (220–260 °C). Water is eliminated in the reaction, and it is also continuously removed by distillation:

 n C6H4(CO2H)2 + n HOCH2CH2OH → [(CO)C6H4(CO2CH2CH2O)]n + 2n H2O

Bio-PET
Bio-PET is the bio-based counterpart of PET.  Essentially in Bio-PET, the MEG is manufactured from ethylene derived from sugar cane ethanol.  A better process based on oxidation of ethanol has been proposed, and it is also technically possible to make PTA from readily available biobased furfural.

Degradation
PET is subject to degradation during processing. If the moisture level is too high, hydrolysis will reduce the molecular weight by chain scission, resulting in brittleness.

If the residence time and/or melt temperature are too high, then thermal degradation or thermooxidative degradation will occur resulting in:

discoloration
reduced molecular weight 
formation of acetaldehyde, 
cross-linking ("gel" or "fish-eye" formation). 

Mitigation measures include
copolymerisation. Comonomers such as CHDM or isophthalic acid lower the melting point and thus the melt temperature of the resin (copolymers, above). 
The addition of polymer stabilisers such as phosphites.

Acetaldehyde
Acetaldehyde is a colorless, volatile substance with a fruity smell. Although it forms naturally in some fruit, it can cause an off-taste in bottled water. Acetaldehyde forms by degradation of PET through the mishandling of the material. High temperatures (PET decomposes above 300 °C or 570 °F), high pressures, extruder speeds (excessive shear flow raises temperature), and long barrel residence times all contribute to the production of acetaldehyde. Photo-oxidation can also cause the gradual formation acetaldehyde over the object's lifespan. This proceeds via a Type II Norrish reaction.
 

When acetaldehyde is produced, some of it remains dissolved in the walls of a container and then diffuses into the product stored inside, altering the taste and aroma. This is not such a problem for non-consumables (such as shampoo), for fruit juices (which already contain acetaldehyde), or for strong-tasting drinks like soft drinks. For bottled water, however, low acetaldehyde content is quite important, because, if nothing masks the aroma, even extremely low concentrations (10–20 parts per billion in the water) of acetaldehyde can produce an off-taste.

Biodegradation

At least one species of bacterium in the genus Nocardia can degrade PET with an esterase enzyme.  Esterases are enzymes able to cleave the ester bond.  Also, the initial degradation of PET can be esterases expressed by Bacillus and Nocardia.

Japanese scientists have isolated a bacterium Ideonella sakaiensis that possesses two enzymes which can break down the PET into smaller pieces that the bacterium can digest. A colony of  I. sakaiensis can disintegrate a plastic film in about six weeks.

An enzyme based on a natural PET-ase was designed with the help of a machine learning algorithm to be able to tolerate pH and temperature changes by the University of Texas at Austin. The PET-ase was found to able to degrade various products and could break them down as fast as 24 hours.

Environmental concerns

Resource depletion
Compared to the use of petroleum as fuel, however, the amount of crude oil processed into PET is very small. The total production capacity of PET is around 30 million tons, compared to 4.2 billion tons of crude oil production, thus around 0.7% of crude oil is processed into PET.

End of life

Recycle
PET bottles lend themselves well to recycling (see below).  In many countries PET bottles are recycled to a substantial degree, for example about 75% in Switzerland. The term rPET is commonly used to describe the recycled material, though it is also referred to as R-PET or post-consumer PET (POSTC-PET).

Energy recovery
PET is a desirable fuel for Waste-to-energy plants, as it has a high calorific value which helps to reduce the use of primary resources for energy generation.

Littering
Nevertheless, littering has become a prominent issue in public opinion, and PET bottles are a visible part of that.

Dumping of apparel
A substantial amount of post consumer waste from the textile industry ends up in landfills in developing countries such as Chile and in countries in West Africa such as Ghana.  PET being a substantial component of apparel, this waste in landfills contains much PET.

Microfibres from apparel and microplastics
Clothing sheds microfibres in use, during washing and machine drying. Plastic litter slowly forms small particles. Microplastics which are present on the bottom of the river or seabed can be ingested by small marine life, thus entering the food chain. As PET has a higher density than water, a significant amount of PET microparticles may be precipitated in sewage treatment plants. PET microfibers generated by apparel wear, washing or machine drying can become airborne, and be dispersed into fields, where they are ingested by livestock or plants and end up in the human food supply. SAPEA have declared that such particles 'do not pose a widespread risk'.
PET is known to degrade when exposed to sunlight and oxygen.  As of 2016, scarce information exists regarding the life-time of the synthetic polymers in the environment.

Safety
Commentary published in Environmental Health Perspectives in April 2010 suggested that PET might yield endocrine disruptors under conditions of common use and recommended research on this topic. Proposed mechanisms include leaching of phthalates as well as leaching of antimony.
An article published in Journal of Environmental Monitoring in April 2012 concludes that antimony concentration in deionized water stored in PET bottles stays within EU's acceptable limit even if stored briefly at temperatures up to 60 °C (140 °F), while bottled contents (water or soft drinks) may occasionally exceed the EU limit after less than a year of storage at room temperature.

Antimony
Antimony (Sb) is a metalloid element that is used as a catalyst in the form of compounds such as antimony trioxide (Sb2O3) or antimony triacetate in the production of PET. After manufacturing, a detectable amount of antimony can be found on the surface of the product. This residue can be removed with washing. Antimony also remains in the material itself and can, thus, migrate out into food and drinks. Exposing PET to boiling or microwaving can increase the levels of antimony significantly, possibly above US EPA maximum contamination levels.
The drinking water limit assessed by WHO is 20 parts per billion (WHO, 2003), and the drinking water limit in the United States is 6 parts per billion. Although antimony trioxide is of low toxicity when taken orally, its presence is still of concern. The Swiss Federal Office of Public Health investigated the amount of antimony migration, comparing waters bottled in PET and glass: The antimony concentrations of the water in PET bottles were higher, but still well below the allowed maximum concentration. The Swiss Federal Office of Public Health concluded that small amounts of antimony migrate from the PET into bottled water, but that the health risk of the resulting low concentrations is negligible (1% of the "tolerable daily intake" determined by the WHO). A later (2006) but more widely publicized study found similar amounts of antimony in water in PET bottles.
The WHO has published a risk assessment for antimony in drinking water.

Fruit juice concentrates (for which no guidelines are established), however, that were produced and bottled in PET in the UK were found to contain up to 44.7 μg/L of antimony, well above the EU limits for tap water of 5 μg/L.

Bottle processing equipment

There are two basic molding methods for PET bottles, one-step and two-step. In two-step molding, two separate machines are used. The first machine injection molds the preform, which resembles a test tube, with the bottle-cap threads already molded into place. The body of the tube is significantly thicker, as it will be inflated into its final shape in the second step using stretch blow molding.

In the second step, the preforms are heated rapidly and then inflated against a two-part mold to form them into the final shape of the bottle. Preforms (uninflated bottles) are now also used as robust and unique containers themselves; besides novelty candy, some Red Cross chapters distribute them as part of the Vial of Life program to homeowners to store medical history for emergency responders.

In one-step machines, the entire process from raw material to finished container is conducted within one machine, making it especially suitable for molding non-standard shapes (custom molding), including jars, flat oval, flask shapes, etc. Its greatest merit is the reduction in space, product handling and energy, and far higher visual quality than can be achieved by the two-step system.

Polyester recycling industry

While most thermoplastics can, in principle, be recycled, PET bottle recycling is more practical than many other plastic applications because of the high value of the resin and the almost exclusive use of PET for widely used water and carbonated soft drink bottling. The prime uses for recycled PET are polyester fiber, strapping, and non-food containers.

Because of the recyclability of PET and the relative abundance of post-consumer waste in the form of bottles, PET is rapidly gaining market share as a carpet fiber. Mohawk Industries released everSTRAND in 1999, a 100% post-consumer recycled content PET fiber. Since that time, more than 17 billion bottles have been recycled into carpet fiber. Pharr Yarns, a supplier to numerous carpet manufacturers including Looptex, Dobbs Mills, and Berkshire Flooring, produces a BCF (bulk continuous filament) PET carpet fiber containing a minimum of 25% post-consumer recycled content.

PET, like many plastics, is also an excellent candidate for thermal disposal (incineration), as it is composed of carbon, hydrogen, and oxygen, with only trace amounts of catalyst elements (but no sulfur). PET has the energy content of soft coal.

When recycling polyethylene terephthalate or PET or polyester, in general three ways have to be differentiated:

The chemical recycling back to the initial raw materials purified terephthalic acid (PTA) or dimethyl terephthalate (DMT) and ethylene glycol (EG) where the polymer structure is destroyed completely, or in process intermediates like bis(2-hydroxyethyl) terephthalate
The mechanical recycling where the original polymer properties are being maintained or reconstituted.
The chemical recycling where transesterification takes place and other glycols/polyols or glycerol are added to make a polyol which may be used in other ways such as polyurethane production or PU foam production In addition, PET can even be recycled chemically into epoxy based products including paints. 

Chemical recycling of PET will become cost-efficient only applying high capacity recycling lines of more than 50,000 tons/year. Such lines could only be seen, if at all, within the production sites of very large polyester producers. Several attempts of industrial magnitude to establish such chemical recycling plants have been made in the past but without resounding success. Even the promising chemical recycling in Japan has not become an industrial breakthrough so far. The two reasons for this are: at first, the difficulty of consistent and continuous waste bottles sourcing in such a huge amount at one single site, and, at second, the steadily increased prices and price volatility of collected bottles. The prices of baled bottles increased for instance between the years 2000 and 2008 from about 50 Euro/ton to over 500 Euro/ton in 2008.

Mechanical recycling or direct circulation of PET in the polymeric state is operated in most diverse variants today. These kinds of processes are typical of small and medium-size industry. Cost-efficiency can already be achieved with plant capacities within a range of 5000–20,000 tons/year. In this case, nearly all kinds of recycled-material feedback into the material circulation are possible today. These diverse recycling processes are being discussed hereafter in detail.

Besides chemical contaminants and degradation products generated during first processing and usage, mechanical impurities are representing the main part of quality depreciating impurities in the recycling stream. Recycled materials are increasingly introduced into manufacturing processes, which were originally designed for new materials only. Therefore, efficient sorting, separation and cleaning processes become most important for high quality recycled polyester.

When talking about polyester recycling industry, we are concentrating mainly on recycling of PET bottles, which are meanwhile used for all kinds of liquid packaging like water, carbonated soft drinks, juices, beer, sauces, detergents, household chemicals and so on. Bottles are easy to distinguish because of shape and consistency and separate from waste plastic streams either by automatic or by hand-sorting processes. The established polyester recycling industry consists of three major sections:

 PET bottle collection and waste separation: waste logistics
 Production of clean bottle flakes: flake production
 Conversion of PET flakes to final products: flake processing

Intermediate product from the first section is baled bottle waste with a PET content greater than 90%. Most common trading form is the bale but also bricked or even loose, pre-cut bottles are common in the market. In the second section, the collected bottles are converted to clean PET bottle flakes. This step can be more or less complex and complicated depending on required final flake quality. During the third step, PET bottle flakes are processed to any kind of products like film, bottles, fiber, filament, strapping or intermediates like pellets for further processing and engineering plastics.

Besides this external (post-consumer) polyester bottle recycling, numbers of internal (pre-consumer) recycling processes exist, where the wasted polymer material does not exit the production site to the free market, and instead is reused in the same production circuit. In this way, fiber waste is directly reused to produce fiber, preform waste is directly reused to produce preforms, and film waste is directly reused to produce film.

PET bottle recycling

The only form of PET that is widely recycled in 2022 is the bottle.  These are recycled by 'mechanical recycling' increasingly to bottles but still to other forms such as film or fibre.  Other forms of polyester are not (as of 2022) collected in significant quantities.

Significant investments were announced in 2021 and 2022 for chemical recycling of PET by glycolysis, methanolysis, and enzymatic recycling to recover monomers. Initially these will also use bottles as feedstock but it is expected that fibres will also be recycled this way in future.

See also

 BoPET (biaxially oriented PET)
 Bioplastic
 PET bottle recycling
 Plastic recycling
 Polycyclohexylenedimethylene terephthalate—a polyester with a similar structure to PET
 Polyester
 Solar water disinfection—a method of disinfecting water using only sunlight and plastic PET bottles

References

External links

 American Plastics Council: PlasticInfo.org
 KenPlas Industry Ltd.: "What is PET (Polyethylene Terephthalate)" 
 "WAVE Polymer Technology: PET (Polyethylene Terephthalate) flakes processing"
 Arropol commercial producer of polyol from post-consumer PET fiber

Biomaterials
Terephthalate esters
Commodity chemicals
English inventions
Flexible electronics
Household chemicals
Plastics
Polyesters
Polymers
Thermoplastics
Transparent materials